Mangalore is a town in the state of Victoria, Australia. The town is the Shire of Strathbogie local government area, 2 hours north of Melbourne. It was served by the Mangalore Railway Station, and is currently served by the Mangalore Airport. It is accessible by road along the Goulburn Valley Highway and Hume Highway.

Climate

References

External links

Towns in Victoria (Australia)
Shire of Strathbogie
Shire of Mitchell